Beast is a 2017 British psychological thriller film written and directed by Michael Pearce, starring Jessie Buckley, Johnny Flynn and Geraldine James.

The film had its world premiere in the Platform section at the 2017 Toronto International Film Festival.

Plot
Treated by her controlling and vicious mother as flawed and a burden, 27-year-old Moll works as a tour guide in Jersey while living with her wealthy parents. She is expected to help care for her father, who suffers from dementia, and to provide babysitting for her niece.  The island community is on-edge following a string of unsolved rape/murders of young girls.

During Moll's birthday party, her sister hijacks the reception by announcing she is pregnant. Feeling undervalued by her family, Moll engages in self harm and then leaves the party for a nightclub where she meets a man; they dance, but in the morning as they walk on the beach, he begins forcing himself on her despite her pleas for him to stop. At that moment a poacher with a hunting rifle rescues her. She is drawn to this young man, Pascal, craving love and excitement, although she is warned by family that he is a low class loser. As their relationship blossoms, Moll reveals to him that as a teenager she stabbed a classmate with scissors, claiming it was in self-defence. He shows his support for her.

A fourth murder victim is discovered, a girl who disappeared on the night of Moll's birthday party. Moll is warned by the local police detective, named Clifford, who fancies her, that Pascal was the main suspect in an earlier murder, and was convicted at 18 of sexually assaulting a 14 year old. She lies to him claiming she met Pascal at the nightclub and they danced there all night. Moll confronts Pascal about both accusations, and he reacts angrily, saying that every day he regrets his mistakes, but the sex with the girl was consensual, and she was manipulated into lying about him. He lets slip that he loves her, and she lovingly reciprocates.

At a formal function at the local country club with her family, Moll's sister gets Pascal ejected for wearing jeans. An indignant Moll makes a toast saying she forgives her family for everything "they've done for her," and as they leave she wrecks the immaculate putting green. She moves into Pascal's modest house, but one night the police barge in to arrest Pascal, and interrogate her. She repeats her lie about meeting him in the club. The lead detective accuses Moll of protecting a murderer who lacks the capacity to love anyone, and wonders aloud if she is seeking retribution against the community. Moll returns to Pascal's house alone, where she is plagued by nightmares, and hounded by the press.

Moll becomes overwhelmed by guilt at her job, and goes to find the girl she stabbed, who has a scar on her cheek. Moll apologizes and claims she wants to make amends, but when she says she did it in self-defence, the woman yells at her to leave. Moll then attends the deceased girl's memorial, and attempts to comfort the girl's mother, but is yelled at and chased out.

Clifford informs her that they have caught the real murderer, an immigrant farmer, and apologizes for treating her with suspicion but insists that Pascal is still bad news. Relieved, Moll and Pascal celebrate by going out drinking, but when she tells him she cannot stay on this island and suggests they build a life elsewhere, he reacts angrily. They argue, and he slams her against a wall, choking her. He apologizes, but she runs to Clifford's house and admits to lying about Pascal's whereabouts. She asks him if the immigrant farmer confessed, and he says he did not. He tells her to get out. She goes to where the latest victim was discovered, lies down in the dirty hole and cries in remorse.
 
At a beach front restaurant, Moll plies Pascal with alcohol, and invites him to admit to the murders, saying she absolutely accepts him for whoever he is. She coaxes him by admitting her own secret: that she actually stabbed that girl in revenge. Pascal appears torn, then says, "It's over. They were nothing to me." Moll seems relieved and happy. On the drive home she asks for a kiss, and when they lean into each other, Moll unbuckles his seat belt and jerks the wheel, throwing him out of the car. Badly injured in the street, he begs her to help, claiming that they are "the same." Moll strangles him, and gets to her feet.

Cast
 Jessie Buckley as Moll
 Johnny Flynn as Pascal Renouf
 Emily Taaffe as Tamara
 Geraldine James as Hilary Huntingdon
 Trystan Gravelle as Clifford
 Oliver Maltman as Harrison
 Charley Palmer Rothwell as Leigh Dutot
 Shannon Tarbet as Polly
 Olwen Fouéré as Theresa Kelly
 Tim Woodward as Fletcher
 Imogen de Ste Croix as Melissa

Release
Altitude Film Distribution acquired the distribution rights for the UK. Beast had a limited theatrical release in the UK on 27 April 2018.

30West acquired the North American distribution rights to Beast four days after its Toronto International Film Festival premiere and released the film in the United States in partnership with Roadside Attractions on 11 May 2018, after screening at the 2018 Sundance Film Festival in that country.

Critical reception
The film has received a positive critical response. On review aggregator website Rotten Tomatoes, the film has an approval rating of 92% based on 142 reviews, and an average rating of 7.28/10. The website's critical consensus reads, "Beast plays like bleak poetry, unfurling its psychological thrills while guided by its captivating leads and mesmerizing, visceral visuals." On Metacritic, the film has a weighted average score of 74 out of 100, based on 19 critics, indicating "generally favorable reviews".

For The Canadian Press, David Friend called it "a twisty story about the monster that lies within all of us, and struggle to keep it contained." Peter Howell of the Toronto Star said it was "a jagged but memorable feature... that slowly yields its truths."

Accolades

References

External links
 

2017 films
2017 psychological thriller films
2010s mystery thriller films
British psychological thriller films
British mystery thriller films
Films shot in Jersey
Films set in the Channel Islands
Jersey in fiction
2010s English-language films
2010s British films